Hitcham was a village in Buckinghamshire, England.  Today it is indistinguishable from the extended village of Burnham (where the 2011 Census was included) and is no longer marked on Ordnance Survey 1:50000 maps as a separate settlement. It is to the west of Burnham, close to the village of Taplow, and adjacent to the common on which Burnham Beeches stands.

The village name 'Hitcham' is Anglo Saxon in origin, and means 'Hycga's homestead'.  In the Domesday Book of 1086 the village was recorded as Hucheham.

The civil parish of Hitcham was abolished in 1934 under a County Review Order, with the urban part going to Burnham parish, a larger but less populous part going to Taplow, and a tiny sliver going to Dorney.

The road Hitcham Lane still exists, and features Hitcham House, a large Manor House, now subdivided into several private residential properties.

References
Vision of Britain

External links

Villages in Buckinghamshire
Former civil parishes in Buckinghamshire
Burnham, Buckinghamshire